Dassanayake Mudiyanselage Loku Banda Dassanayake (kwon as L. B. Dassanayake) (born 14 April 1920) was a Ceylonese politician. He was the Parliamentary Secretary to the Minister of Communications and member of Parliament of Sri Lanka from Gampola  representing the United National Party from 1960 to 1970. He unsuccessfully contested the 1965 Ceylonese parliamentary election and the 1970 Ceylonese parliamentary election

References

Members of the 5th Parliament of Ceylon
Members of the 6th Parliament of Ceylon
United National Party politicians
Sinhalese politicians
1920 births

Date of death missing
Year of death missing